The 2019–20 Greek Basketball Cup was the 45th edition of Greek top-tier level professional domestic basketball cup competition. The previous winner of the cup was Panathinaikos. The cup competition started on 18 September 2019 and ended on 16 February 2020. AEK won the competition.

Format
The top six placed teams from the top-tier level Greek Basket League's 2018–19 season, gained an automatic bye to the 2019–20 Greek Cup quarterfinals. While the eight lower-placed teams from the 2018–19 Greek Basket League season; along with all of the teams from the 2nd-tier level Greek A2 Basket League's 2018–19 season, and the 3rd-tier level Greek B Basket League's 2018–19 season, played in preliminary rounds, competing for the other two quarterfinals places. All rounds were played under a single elimination format.

Preliminary rounds

Phase 1

Round 1

Round 2

Note: Ippokratis Kos decided to forfeit their game against Farsalon.

Round 3

Phase 2

Round 1

Round 2

Round 3

Final rounds

Awards

Finals Most Valuable Player

Finals Top Scorer

References

External links
 Official Hellenic Basketball Federation Site 
 Official Greek Basket League Site 
 Official Greek Basket League English website 

Greek Basketball Cup
Cup